Yanis Esmerelda David is a French athlete, born on 12 December 1997. Yanis is a specialist in the women's triple jump, representing France and its overseas department of Guadeloupe in international competition.

Life
David was born in 1997 in Les Abymes. She attended the Cite Scolaire d'Excellence Sportive in Abymes, Guadeloupe and enrolled in 2015 at the University of Florida.

David won gold in the triple jump event at the Youth Olympic Games of 2014 at Nanjing, China. She qualified for the 2015 European Junior Championships long jump qualifying round, but did not start.

With a mark of 6.48 m  Yanis reset the 27-year-old CARIFTA record for the women's Long Jump at the 2016 edition of the Games in St George's, Grenada.

At the  IAAF World U20 Championships Bydgoszcz 2016, Yanis won the gold medal in the long jump event, clearing 6.42m.

College
While at Florida, she won the Honda Sports Award as the nation's best female track and field competitor in 2019.

Personal Bests

References

 

1997 births
Living people
French female triple jumpers
Athletes (track and field) at the 2014 Summer Youth Olympics
Guadeloupean triple jumpers
Guadeloupean female athletes
Florida Gators women's track and field athletes
Mediterranean Games gold medalists for France
Athletes (track and field) at the 2018 Mediterranean Games
Mediterranean Games medalists in athletics
Mediterranean Games gold medalists in athletics
Youth Olympic gold medalists for France
Youth Olympic gold medalists in athletics (track and field)
Athletes (track and field) at the 2020 Summer Olympics
Olympic athletes of France